Josef Källström (born 25 February 1974) is a Swedish rower. He competed in the men's lightweight double sculls event at the 2000 Summer Olympics.

References

1974 births
Living people
Swedish male rowers
Olympic rowers of Sweden
Rowers at the 2000 Summer Olympics
Sportspeople from Gothenburg